Dominic Thomas (born 14 February 1996) is a Scottish professional footballer who plays as a winger for Queen's Park. Thomas, who started his professional career with Motherwell, has also played for Kilmarnock and has been on loan over two spells at both Queen of the South and Dumbarton.

Club career

Motherwell
Thomas was a product of Celtic's academy until 2010 and then transferred to the Fir Park club.

On 20 December 2014, Thomas made his debut for Motherwell as a substitute in a narrow away win versus St Mirren. Thomas signed a new contract with the Steelmen on 6 March 2015 to keep him at the club until 2018.

Although by now established in the senior squad, at the end of the 2015–16 season Thomas returned to the Motherwell Development team to help them win the Scottish Youth Cup for the first time.

Queen of the South (first loan spell)
On 1 January 2017, Thomas was loaned to Queen of the South for the second half of the 2016–17 season. Thomas debuted for the club on 7 January 2017, in a 3–0 away win at St Mirren. The following weekend, Thomas scored his first and the Doonhamers'  third goal in a 3–3 draw versus Dundee United at Tannadice. Thomas returned his parent club Motherwell at the end of the season.

Kilmarnock

2017–18
Thomas requested a transfer from Motherwell during summer of 2017. He was duly released by the Lanarkshire club and signed a three-year contract with Kilmarnock on 12 July 2017.

On 30 January 2018, Thomas returned to Palmerston Park until the end of the 2017-18 season, joining the Doonhamers for a second loan spell.

2018–19: Dumbarton loans
Thomas joined Scottish League One side Dumbarton on loan in September 2018, scoring on his debut in a defeat against Stranraer.

After returning to Kilmarnock in January 2019, and being named in the club's squad for their Scottish Cup tie with Forfar Athletic, Thomas re-joined Dumbarton on loan on deadline day. During his time at the club he was nominated for PFA Scottish League One Players' Player of the Year and won Dumbarton's Young Player of the Year award. In total he made 26 appearances for the Sons, scoring 14 times and was named in the PFA Scotland League One Team of the Year.

2019–20
Thomas played regularly for Kilmarnock in the first part of the season, although mainly as a substitute. He was loaned to Championship club Dunfermline Athletic in January 2020, a day after Killie teammate Greg Kiltie had been recalled from a loan there. Although the 2019–20 was curtailed, Thomas impressed during his brief loan period with the side, and was signed on a permanent two-year deal on 10 July 2020.

International career
In March 2017, Thomas made his first appearance for the Scotland Under-21 side in a friendly against Estonia. He was capped six times at that level.

Personal life
Thomas attended Trinity High School (Rutherglen) and was in the same year group as fellow Celtic youth team player and future Kilmarnock teammate Stuart Findlay; Kevin Nisbet, who later was playing for Dunfermline when Thomas arrived, was in the year below at the school.

In 2017 he began operating a youth football training programme based at the sports centre attached to his former school.

Career statistics

Honours
 Scottish League One Players' Player of the Year: 2018–19 – nominee
Scottish League One Player of the Month: February 2019

References

External links
 
 

1996 births
Living people
Sportspeople from Cambuslang
People educated at Trinity High School, Rutherglen
Footballers from Glasgow
Scottish footballers
Association football wingers
Celtic F.C. players
Motherwell F.C. players
Queen of the South F.C. players
Scottish Professional Football League players
Scotland under-21 international footballers
Kilmarnock F.C. players
Dumbarton F.C. players
Dunfermline Athletic F.C. players
Footballers from South Lanarkshire
Queen's Park F.C. players